A soft tissue injury is the damage of muscles, ligaments and tendons throughout the body. Common soft tissue injuries usually occur from a sprain, strain, a one-off blow resulting in a contusion or overuse of a particular part of the body. Soft tissue injuries can result in pain, swelling, bruising and loss of function.

Signs and symptoms

Sprains 

A sprain is a type of acute injury which results from the stretching or tearing of a ligament. Depending on the severity of the sprain, the movement on the joint can be compromised since ligaments aid in the stability and support of joints. Sprains are commonly seen in vulnerable areas such as the wrists, knees and ankles. They can occur from movements such as falling on an outstretched hand or a twisting of the ankle or foot.

The severity of a sprain can be classified:
 Grade 1: Only some of the fibers in the ligament are torn, and the injured site is moderately painful and swollen. Function in the joint will be unaffected for the most part.
 Grade 2: Many of the ligament fibers are torn, and pain and swelling is moderate. The functionality of the joint is compromised.
 Grade 3: The soft tissue is completely torn, and functionality and strength on the joint is completely compromised. In most cases, surgery is needed to repair the damage.

Strains 

A strain is a type of acute injury that occurs to the muscle or tendon. Similar to sprains, it can vary in severity, from a stretching of the muscle or tendon to a complete tear of the tendon from the muscle. Some of the most common places that strains occur are in the foot, back of the leg (hamstring), or back.

Bruising (contusion) 

A contusion is the discoloration of the skin, which results from underlying muscle fibers and connective tissue being crushed. This can happen in a variety of ways such as a direct blow to the skin, or a fall taken against a hard surface. The discoloration in the skin is present when blood begins to pool around the injury.

Tendinitis 

Tendinitis is a type of overuse injury to the tendons, which demonstrates signs of inflammation of tendons around a joint. Tendinitis is the most common cause of shoulder pain and also leg pain . Tendinitis occurs when there is repetitive stress on the subacromial bursa, which causes the bones to make contact with the tendons and irritate them.

Diagnosis

Classifications

Acute injuries 

Any type of injury that occurs to the body through sudden trauma, such as a fall, twist or blow to the body. A few examples of this type of injury would be sprains, strains and contusions.

Overuse injuries 
An overuse injury occurs when a certain activity is repeated frequently and the body does not have enough time to recover between occurrences. Examples include bursitis and tendinitis.

Commonly injured tissues
With examples of each. Parentheses indicate location in body
 Ligaments
Anterior cruciate ligament (knee), medial collateral ligament (knee), ulnar collateral ligaments (wrist/hand), interspinous ligaments (vertebrae)
 Muscles
Biceps brachii (upper arm), rectus femoris (thigh), transverse abdominis (abdominals)
 Tendons
Patellar tendon (knee), calcaneal/Achilles tendon (foot/lower leg), biceps tendon (shoulder/elbow)
 Nerves
Brachial plexus (shoulder), ulnar nerve (elbow/hand), peroneal nerve (ankle/foot), cranial nerves I-XII(head)
 Bones
Femur (leg), humerus (arm), ribs (torso), metatarsals I-VI (foot), metacarpals I-VI (hand)
 Cartilage
Menisci (knee), intervertebral discs (spine), acetabulum (hip)

Management

RICE method 
The RICE method is an effective procedure used in the initial treatment of a soft tissue injury.

 Rest
 It is suggested that the patient take a break from the activity that caused the injury in order to give the injury time to heal.
 Ice
 The injury should be iced on and off in 20 minute intervals, avoiding direct contact of the ice with the skin.
 Compression
 Bandaging the injury will compress it, and prevent any further bleeding or swelling from occurring.
 Elevation
 Elevating the injury above the heart while resting will aid in the reduction of swelling.

No HARM protocol 
This mnemonic indicates what  to do within the first 48–72 hours after the injury in order to speed up the recovery process.

 Heat
 Applying heat to the injured area can cause blood flow and swelling to increase.
 Alcohol
 Alcohol can inhibit the ability to feel if the injury is becoming more aggravated, as well as increasing blood flow and swelling.
 Re-injury
 Avoid any activities that could aggravate the injury and cause further damage.
 Massage
 Massaging an injured area can promote blood flow and swelling, and potentially cause more damage if done too early.

Treatment
If severe pain persists after the first 24hours it is recommended that an individual consult with a professional who can make a diagnosis and implement a treatment plan so the patient can return to everyday activities. To make a full diagnosis, a professional may use nerve conduction studies to localize nerve dysfunction (e.g. carpal tunnel syndrome), assess severity, and help with prognosis. Electrodiagnosis also helps differentiate between myopathy and neuropathy. Using the RICE method can somewhat be controversial as the science behind using ice is not necessarily very clear. On one hand, ice diminishes pain, metabolism, and muscle spasms.  It also minimizes the inflammatory process and edema, which helps one recover from a soft-tissue injury. However, creatine kinase-MB isoform and myoglobin levels circulating in the blood increased after exercising. Ice impedes the recovery process by keeping the Creatine kinase-MB isoform and myoglobin levels increased 2–3 days post exercise. It is therefore important to weigh the pros and cons before applying any treatment, including the use of ice.

Ultimately, the best method of imaging soft tissue is magnetic resonance imaging (MRI), though it is cost-prohibitive and carries a high false positive rate.

References

Sources
 Flegel, Melinda J. (2004). Sport first aid: A coach’s guide to preventing and responding to injuries. Hong Kong, Japan: Human Kinetics.
 Lindsay, R., Watson, G., Hickmont, D., Broadfoot, A., & Bruynel, L. (1994). Treat your own strains sprains and bruises. New Zealand: Spinal Publications.
 Lovering, R.M. (2008). "Physical therapy and related interventions". In P.M. Tiidus (ed.), Skeletal muscle damage and repair (pp. 219–230). United States of America: Human Kinetics.
 Prentice, William E. "Tissue Response to Injury", Principles of Athletic Training: A Competency Based Approach. 14th ed. New York: McGraw Hill Companies, 2011. 260–277.
 Subotnick, Steven (1991). Sports and Exercise Injuries: Conventional, Homeopathic and Alternative Treatments. California, United States of America: North Atlantic Books.

Injuries
Soft tissue disorders